Allan Brett Henschell (born 6 June 1961) is a former Australian first-class cricketer who represented Queensland at first-class and List A cricket. He is also working as a coach in Queensland and has established his own Cricket Academy called Henschell Cricket in 2008.

References

External links 
 Henschell Cricket Academy website

1961 births
Living people
Queensland cricketers
Australian cricketers
Cricketers from Queensland
People from the Darling Downs